Wang Lingke (born 30 May 2002) is a Chinese footballer currently playing as a midfielder for Shijiazhuang Gongfu.

Club career
Wang was born in Kaiyuan, Yunnan, and started his career at the Kaiyuan Junior Sports School. He spent two years with the Atlético Madrid youth team, as part of the Wanda Group "China Football Hope Star" initiative to encourage the development of young Chinese footballers.

In August 2018, having studied in Slovenia earlier in the year, he represented the Honghe state football team. The following year, he moved to Thai League 2 side BTU United. However, by 2021, it was reported that Wang had not appeared for BTU United at all.

On 12 April 2021, Wang was announced as a new player for Kunming Zheng He Shipman. After one year with the China League Two club, he joined Shijiazhuang Gongfu.

International career
Wang was called up to the China under-17 team training in 2017, and the under-19 squad in 2020.

Career statistics

Club
.

References

2002 births
Living people
Footballers from Yunnan
Chinese footballers
China youth international footballers
Association football midfielders
Atlético Madrid footballers
Wang Lingke
China League Two players
China League One players
21st-century Chinese people
Chinese expatriate footballers
Chinese expatriate sportspeople in Spain
Expatriate footballers in Spain
Expatriate footballers in Slovenia
Chinese expatriate sportspeople in Croatia
Expatriate footballers in Croatia
Chinese expatriate sportspeople in Thailand
Expatriate footballers in Thailand